Nigeria competed at the 2004 Summer Olympics in Athens, Greece, from 13 to 29 August 2004. This was the nation's thirteenth appearance at the Olympics, except the 1976 Summer Olympics in Montreal, because of the African boycott. Nigerian Olympic Committee sent a total of 72 athletes, 24 men and 48 women, to the Games to compete in 10 sports. For the first time in its Olympic history, Nigeria was represented by more female than male athletes. Women's basketball and women's football were the only team-based sports in which Nigeria had its representation at these Games. There was only a single competitor in men's freestyle wrestling.

Fifteen athletes from the Nigerian team had previously competed in Sydney, including five football players from the women's squad and Olympic silver medalist Enefiok Udo-Obong in the men's 4 × 400 m relay. At age 36, sprinter Mary Onyali-Omagbemi became the first Nigerian athlete to compete in fifth Olympic Games, while table tennis players Segun Toriola and Bose Kaffo followed Onyali's footsteps to fulfill their fourth Olympic bid in Athens. For being the oldest and most experienced athlete of the team, Onyali reprised her role to carry the Nigerian flag in the opening ceremony for the second time since 1996.

Nigeria left Athens with only two Olympic bronze medals, all from the men's 4 × 100 m relay (led by Deji Aliu) and 4 × 400 m relay teams (led by Udo-Obong).

Medalists

Athletics

Nigerian athletes have so far achieved qualifying standards in the following athletics events (up to a maximum of 3 athletes in each event at the 'A' Standard, and 1 at the 'B' Standard).

Men

Women

Basketball

Women's tournament

Roster

Group play

Classification match (11th–12th place)

Boxing

Nigeria sent seven boxers to Athens.  Five lost their first matches, while the other two made it to the quarterfinals (one with two wins, the other with a bye and a win) before being defeated.

Football

Women's tournament

The Nigerian team qualified for the Olympics after defeating Ghana on penalties and edging South Africa in a two-leg playoff.

Roster

Group play

Quarterfinals

Judo

Two Nigerian judoka (one man and one woman) qualified for the 2004 Summer Olympics.

Swimming

Men

Women

Table tennis

Eight Nigerian table tennis players qualified for the following events.

Men

Women

Taekwondo

Three Nigerian taekwondo jin qualified for the following events.

Weightlifting

Two Nigerian weightlifters qualified for the following events:

Wrestling 

Men's freestyle

See also
 Nigeria at the 2004 Summer Paralympics

References

External links
Official Report of the XXVIII Olympiad
Nigerian Olympic Committee

Nations at the 2004 Summer Olympics
2004
Olympics